Feodor Chaliapin Jr. (6 October 1905 – 17 September 1992) was a Russian Empire-born actor who appeared in many American and Italian films.

Life

Chaliapin was the son and namesake of the  great operatic bass Feodor Chaliapin. He was born in Moscow, Russian Empire, and had a distinguished career in acting throughout Europe, mainly in Italy. His mother was Iola Tornaghi, a ballerina who abandoned a promising ballet career to care for Feodor and his five siblings. When the Russian Revolution occurred in October 1917, the Chaliapins attempted to continue living in Russia, but this became impossible, especially after the Bolsheviks reputedly confiscated his wealthy father's money and property. Along with many other Russian émigrés, part of the family emigrated to Paris in 1924, via Finland. The senior Chaliapin used this as his world base, like other emigres and members of their families who often ended up living in the United States such as Igor Stravinsky, Sergei Rachmaninoff and, for a while, Sergei Prokofiev.

Chaliapin grew up in a family who spoke three languages. He received an excellent education in Moscow and lived there until 1924, when he immigrated to Paris to be with his father, leaving behind his mother and the rest of the family. Chaliapin knew some of the greatest composers and conductors of the 20th century, particularly Rachmaninoff, a personal family friend and teacher of his father. Tired of living in his father's shadow in Paris, Chaliapin struck out on his own, moving to Hollywood to begin his film career — first in silent movies, in which his then-heavy accent would not be heard in the small bit parts he played. In his later years, Chaliapin achieved international stardom in more major roles.

Chaliapin is perhaps most remembered by modern audiences for the film The Name of the Rose (1986), in which he played the venerable Jorge de Burgos. He had a major role in Inferno (1980). One of his most memorable roles was as the perplexed grandfather in Moonstruck (1987), starring Cher. The producers, in deciding whether to hire him for the role, sought the advice of Sean Connery, who is reputed to have said, "He's great, but he will steal the show."  Chaliapin also played the role of Leonides Cox, Robert De Niro's father in Stanley & Iris (1990). His last notable film role was as Professor Bartnev in The Inner Circle (1991), a true story about Soviet Russia under the dictatorship of Joseph Stalin.

In one of his briefest roles, Chaliapin dies in the arms of Gary Cooper in the opening scenes of For Whom the Bell Tolls (1943), based on Ernest Hemingway's 1940 novel.

Of Chaliapin's early film roles, one of the most memorable was in Victor Tourjansky's Prisoner of the Volga (1959). Much of his filmography lies in Italian films, including an appearance as Julius Caesar in Federico Fellini's film Roma.

Chaliapin was reunited with his mother, who then was 87 years old, in Rome in 1960. His mother's emigration was helped by the reforms (the so-called "thaw") of then Soviet first secretary Nikita Khrushchev. The price of this was having to leave behind a museum-quality home and a magnificent art collection in Moscow as collected by Feodor Chaliapin, Sr. The only objects of art permitted to leave Russia were photograph albums of Chaliapin's childhood and youth in Moscow.

Mikhail Gorbachev, the last General Secretary of the Communist Party of the Soviet Union, instituted political and economic reforms known as perestroika.  Under these reforms, Chaliapin was able to remove his father's remains from Paris to Novodevichy Cemetery in Moscow. The grave is marked by a white marble statue of Chaliapin, Sr.

In 1992, Chaliapin died of natural causes after an illness in Rome, where he had lived since World War II. He was survived by his twin sister, Tatiana Chaliapin Chernoff, and several nieces and nephews.

He is buried at the Cimitero Flaminio, Provincia di Roma, in Lazio, Italy.

Selected filmography

 Into Her Kingdom (1926) – Russian Officer and Court Leader
 Volga Volga (1928)
 The Ship of Lost Souls (1929) – Nick
 Lancer Spy (1937) – Monk (uncredited)
 Exile Express (1939) – Kaishevshy
 Balalaika (1939) – Soldier (uncredited)
 My Life with Caroline (1941) – Sky Man (uncredited)
 Law of the Jungle (1942) – Belts
 Mission to Moscow (1943) – Shop Foreman (uncredited)
 For Whom the Bell Tolls (1943) – Kashkin
 The Seventh Victim (1943) – Leo (uncredited)
 Three Russian Girls (1943) – Terkin
 Song of Russia (1944) – Maxim – Anna's Husband (uncredited)
 Lost in a Harem (1944) – Violinist (uncredited)
 A Royal Scandal (1945) Lackey (uncredited)
 Ziegfeld Follies (1945) Lieutenant ('This Heart of Mine') (uncredited)
 Arch of Triumph (1948) – Scheherazade's Chef (uncredited)
 Herod the Great (1959)
 Prisoner of the Volga (1959) – Boris Fomitsch
 The Cossacks (1960) – Hassan
 The Night They Killed Rasputin (1960)
 Francis of Assisi (1961) – Cardinal Savelli (uncredited)
 Sodom and Gomorrah (1962) – Alabias
 Imperial Venus (1962) Maestro di ballo
 The Executioner of Venice (1963) – Doge Giovanni Bembo
 The Lion of St. Mark (1963) – The Doge
 Buffalo Bill, Hero of the Far West (1965) – Chief White Fox
 Un gangster venuto da Brooklyn (1966)
 Ballata da un miliardo (1967)
 The Subversives (1967)
 Il trapianto (1970) – Don Calogero
 Roma (1972) – Actor Playing Julius Cesar (uncredited)
 The Eroticist (1972) – Senator Torsello
 La colonna infame (1972) – Il cardinale arcivescovo di Milano Federico
 My Brother Anastasia (1973) – Frank Costello
 La linea del fiume (1976) – Nonno di Giacomino
 Smooth Velvet, Raw Silk (1976) – Hal
 Inferno (1980) – Professor Arnold / Dr. Varelli
 Salome (1986) – Messenger
 The Name of the Rose (1986) – Jorge de Burgos
 Moonstruck (1987) – Grandpa Castorini
 Catacombs (1988) – Brother Terrel
 The Mask (1988) – Leonardo's father
 The Gamble (1988) – Federico
 The Church (1989) – The Bishop
 Paganini (1989) – Judge
 Modì (1989) – Pierre-Auguste Renoir
 Stanley & Iris (1990) – Leonides Cox
 The King's Whore (1990) – Scaglia
 Rossini! Rossini! (1991) – Barone Rothschild
 The Inner Circle (1991) – Prof. Bartnev
 Max et Jérémie (1992) – Sam Marberg (final film role)

External links
 Obituary from The New York Times
 

1905 births
1992 deaths
Russian male actors
Russian male silent film actors
Burials at Novodevichy Cemetery
American people of Russian descent
White Russian emigrants to the United States
20th-century American male actors
Emigrants from the Russian Empire to Italy
White Russian emigrants to Italy